Torpan Pojat, shortened to ToPo, is a basketball club based in Helsinki, Finland. Torpan Pojat has their men's and women's team playing in national 1st division and many minor and junior teams in different age categories.

History

The club was formed in 1932 as a sports club for a school in the neighbourhood of Munkkiniemi in Helsinki. Their men's team played for the first time in the predecessor of Korisliiga in 1956 and continued to play a total of 51 seasons in Korisliiga and seven seasons in lower divisions between 1956 and their dissolution in 2013. The women's team played in the highest tier for the first time in 1962, but never managed to establish itself in the league.

Torpan Pojat also played in international competitions. They got their first international match in the 1960–61 season of the FIBA Champion's Cup. The men's team played BC Sparta Prague in the first round, losing both legs (56–65, 47–68). They appeared in the competition also in 1966–67, 1981–82, 1983–84 and 1986–87. The men's team played twice in the Korać Cup (1988–89 and 1989–90) and four times in the Saporta Cup (1996–97, 1997–98, 1998–99 and 1999-00). Torpan Pojat made their record attendance of 9626 in the 1996–97 season of the cup in a game against CSK Samara. They also played once in the VTB United League (2011–12).
 
Former NBA players Dennis Rodman and Scottie Pippen have played for Torpan Pojat. Rodman played one game on 6 November 2005, against Espoon Honka. Rodman played 28 minutes, scored 17 points, and grabbed 6 rebounds. Fifteen of his 17 points were made behind the 3-point line, with a total of 13 attempts from beyond the arc. Pippen played two games in 2008. He played on 4 January 2008 against Porvoon Tarmo scoring 12 points, 7 rebounds, 4 assists and 3 steals in 23 minutes.  On 5 January, against Honka, he had 9 points, 9 rebounds, 4 assists and 2 steals in 29 minutes.

Torpan Pojat was unable to acquire a license to play in Korisliiga for the 2012–2013 season, and were then relegated to a lower division. After the 2012–2013 season spent in a lower division, Torpan Pojat men's team was dissolved and their place in the second level of Finnish basketball, Division I A was transferred to the newly formed Helsinki Seagulls along with the remaining players.

Honours
 Korisliiga
Winners (9): 1960, 1966, 1978, 1981, 1983, 1986, 1996, 1997, 1998
Men's Finnish Cup
Winners (4): 1980, 1992, 1996, 1997

Season by season

Men

 1956 to 1972–73: Korisliiga
 1973–74: Miesten I Divisioona (English: Men's First Division)
 1974–75 to 1999–00: Korisliiga
 2000–01: Miesten I Divisioona A (English: Men's First Division A)

 51 seasons in Korisliiga
 7 seasons in Miesten I Divisioona (English: Men's First Division)

Women

 1962 to 1964–65: Naisten Korisliiga
 1965–66: Naisten I Divisioona (English: Women's First Division)
 1966–67: Naisten Korisliiga
 1967–68 to 1970–71: Naisten I Divisioona (English: Women's First Division)
 1971–72 to 1975–76: Naisten Korisliiga
 1976–77: Naisten I Divisioona (English: Women's First Division)
 1977–78: Naisten Korisliiga
 1978–79 to 1996–97: Naisten I Divisioona (English: Women's First Division)
 1997–98 to 1998–99: Naisten Korisliiga
 1999–00 to 2004–05: Naisten I Divisioona (English: Women's First Division)

 19 seasons in Naisten Korisliiga
 33 seasons in Naisten I Divisioona (English: Women's First Division)

Updated as of season 2013–14

Current roster

Notable players

References

External links
 Official website 
 Women's team in Naisten Korisliiga

Basketball teams in Finland
Basketball teams established in 1932
Sports clubs in Helsinki